Rahara is a village in County Roscommon, Ireland.

As of December 2011, the local primary school, Rahara National School, had an enrollment of 34 children. The Roman Catholic church in Rahara, the Church of Mary Immaculate, is in the combined parish of Knockcroghery, St. John's and Rahara of the Diocese of Elphin.

See also
List of towns and villages in Ireland

References

Towns and villages in County Roscommon